The American Cougars (also known as the USA Cougars or United States Cougars) is the only rugby union team from the United States ever to beat a reigning Currie Cup championship team in South Africa. A combined and invitational side from the United States, the Cougars toured South Africa and Zimbabwe in 1978. The team was coached by Ray Cornbill, coach of the Eagles during the 1970s and 1980s. The squad comprised 25 players from 20 clubs, including 3 from Santa Monica Rugby Football Club, 2 each from Chicago Lions RFC, Washington DC RFC, and UCLA RFC.

Matches 

The Cougars played six games in South Africa: against Natal, Combined Universities, Griquas, Northern Transvaal, South African Gazelles and Rhodesia, and won once.

On 12 August 1978 they lost 12–44 to a racially mixed South African Country Districts XV side at East London. Some 5,500 spectators watched as  future Springbok Errol Tobias contributed two tries to the Districts' total and aided in the scoring of two others. By half-time the Districts were ahead 24–3. Cougars' wing Tommy Smith, usually a fly-half, "registered a spectacular score" that was converted by fullback  Dennis Jablonski. Jablonski added two penalty kicks to complete the visitors' score.

Four days later the Cougars faced a combined Universities of Stellenbosch and Cape Town side on 16 August 1978 at Cape Town.

The highlight of the tour was the Cougars' 18–15 win on 19 August 1978 over Northern Transvaal, who had won the Currie Cup in 1977 and went on to retain their title in 1978.

The tour closed with an international match on 28 August 1978, a 32–15 loss to a Rhodesia side that featured Ray Mordt.

1978 touring squad to southern Africa 
Colours: Red, White & Blue Hoops

Coach: Ray Cornbill

Manager: Keith Seaber

References

1978
Rugby union and apartheid
1978 in rugby union
1978 in South African rugby union